An outdoor bronze sculpture depicting Venezuelan military and political leader Simón Bolívar (1783–1830), by Hugo Daini, is located at the south-east corner of Belgrave Square in London, United Kingdom. The statue was unveiled by James Callaghan, then Secretary of State for Foreign and Commonwealth Affairs, later Prime Minister of the United Kingdom, in 1974.

On the plinth are the words:

The names of countries liberated by Bolívar are inscribed on the base.

See also
 Equestrian statue of Simón Bolívar (Washington, D.C.)
 List of public art in Belgravia

References

External links
 

1974 establishments in England
1974 sculptures
Bronze sculptures in the United Kingdom
Bolivar, Simon
Bolívar, Simón
London